Chang Po-ya (born 5 October 1942) is a Taiwanese politician who is the founder of the Non-Partisan Solidarity Union, a political party in Taiwan.

Early life
Born in what is now Chiayi City to Hsu Shih-hsien and Chang Chin-tung, both physicians, Chang Po-ya is a medical doctor educated in Kaohsiung Medical College (1968), the Institute of Public Health of National Taiwan University (1970), Johns Hopkins University (1974), and Kyorin University (1994).

Political career
She was the mayor of her home city, serving three terms (1983–89, 1997–2000), the first time succeeding her mother, Hsu; the last time succeeding her sister, . The Chang daughters and mother are known as the Hsü Family of Chiayi (許家班). During her first term, martial law was lifted and she led the creation of The First 228 Peace Memorial Monument in Taiwan.

She was the Minister of Health from June 2, 1990 to September 10, 1997 and led the creation of Taiwan's national health insurance system.

Under President Chen Shui-bian, she was the Minister of Interior from May 20, 2000 to February 1, 2002 and also served as Governor of the Taiwan Provincial Government.

On 7 December 2002, came in 4th as an independent candidate in the Kaohsiung City mayoral election.

From 2014 to 2020, she served as the 5th President and first female President of Taiwan's Control Yuan.

Personal life
She is married to Chi Chan-nan (紀展南) with a son and a daughter.

References

External links

Profile of Minister of the Interior Chang Po-ya from Taiwan Panorama (2000)

1942 births
Affiliated Senior High School of National Taiwan Normal University alumni
Johns Hopkins University alumni
Living people
National Taiwan University alumni
Mayors of Chiayi
Female interior ministers
Taiwanese Ministers of the Interior
Taiwanese people of Hoklo descent
Chiayi City Members of the Legislative Yuan
Chairpersons of the Taiwan Provincial Government
Kaohsiung Medical University alumni
Women mayors of places in Taiwan
Taiwanese Presidents of the Control Yuan
Taiwanese Ministers of Health and Welfare
Leaders of the Non-Partisan Solidarity Union
Women government ministers of Taiwan
Taiwanese women physicians
20th-century women physicians
Taiwanese political party founders
21st-century Taiwanese women politicians
20th-century Taiwanese women politicians
21st-century Taiwanese politicians
20th-century Taiwanese politicians
Women governors and heads of sub-national entities
Taiwanese women founders